Jay Benton Silveria (born c. 1963) is a retired lieutenant general in the United States Air Force (USAF). He was the twentieth superintendent of the U.S. Air Force Academy, serving from 2017 to 2020. His previous commands include deputy commander of the United States Air Forces Central Command, commander of the United States Air Force Warfare Center, and commander of 48th Fighter Wing. Rated as a  command pilot, Silvera has more than 3,900 flying hours.

In March 2017, Silveria earned national acclaim for his speech to the cadet wing at Mitchell Hall. Silveria admonished the cadet wing for an event which transpired at the Air Force Academy Preparatory School, where a preparatory school cadet candidate submitted accusations of racism.  Silveria's speech quickly garnered national attention, as he scolded the Air Force Academy cadet wing and demanded the "racists... to get out." Shortly thereafter, however, the claimant at the Air Force Academy Preparatory School confessed that the event was a hoax.

Education
The son of a master sergeant, Silveria is a 1981 graduate of Lakenheath American High School in England, where he participated in soccer, baseball, forensics, drama, and the National Honor Society; he was voted "Most Talented" by his classmates.

Silveria earned a Bachelor of Science degree in 1985 from the U.S. Air Force Academy in Colorado Springs, Colorado. In 1997, he received a Master of Social Science degree from the Maxwell School of Citizenship and Public Affairs of Syracuse University. He later attended the National War College at Fort Lesley J. McNair, in Washington, D.C., and graduated in 2005.

Military career
Throughout his military career, Silveria has held a number of positions in the USAF as a pilot and in command roles. He was promoted to first lieutenant in May 1987, and then captain in 1989. He was an instructor pilot at Williams Air Force Base, Arizona, in the late 1980s, where he flew Cessna T-37 aircraft for the 96th Flying Training Squadron. At the time, T-37s were a primary training aircraft for the USAF. Between 1991 and 1995, he served at Seymour Johnson AFB, North Carolina, where he flew F-15E Strike Eagles for the 334th Fighter Squadron, completing multiple deployments during Operation SOUTHERN WATCH.

Along with a promotion to major in 1997, Silveria assumed the position of aide-de-camp to the Supreme Allied Commander Europe and commander, United States European Command, Supreme Headquarters Allied Powers Europe, in Mons, Belgium. He held this position until July 1999. Silveria was promoted to lieutenant colonel in May 2000 while a student at the Air Command and Staff College. After graduating from the Air Command and Staff College in June 2000, Silveria was assigned to RAF Lakenheath, England, from until July 2004. While there, he served as director of operations of the 48th Operations Support Squadron, as commander of the 492nd Fighter Squadron, and as deputy commander of the 48th Mission Support Group. Shortly after graduating from the National War College in 2005, Silveria was promoted to colonel. He then served as the commander of the 32d Air and Space Operations Center at Ramstein Air Base, Germany, from June 2005 to January 2006, before returning to RAF Lakenheath in England to serve as vice commander of the 48th Fighter Wing from January 2006 to July 2007. From July 2007 to August 2008, Silveria served as special assistant to the commander, United States European Command, in Mons, Belgium. In August 2008, he took command of the 48th Fighter Wing, RAF Lakenheath, England.

In July 2010, Silveria was assigned as inspector general, Air Combat Command, at Langley Air Force Base, Virginia. Shortly after, in September 2010, he was promoted to brigadier general. From March 2012 to March 2013, Silveria served as director, Security Assistance in the Office of Security Cooperation-Iraq. From April 2013 to February 2014, he served as vice commander, 14th Air Force. From February 2014 to April 2016, Silveria served as the commanding general of the United States Air Force Warfare Center, Nellis AFB, Nevada. He had been promoted to major general in June 2014. From April 2016 to May 2017, Silveria served as deputy commander, U.S. Air Forces Central Command and as deputy commander, Combined Air Force Component, U.S. Central Command. In August 2017, Silveria was promoted to lieutenant general and began serving in his final assignment as Superintendent of the USAF Academy. Silveria retired from the United States Air Force on November 1, 2020, and Lieutenant General Richard M. Clark succeeded him as Superintendent.

References

External links

 

 

 

 

United States Air Force Academy people
National War College alumni
Superintendents of the United States Air Force Academy
Recipients of the Legion of Merit
Recipients of the Air Medal
Recipients of the Air Force Distinguished Service Medal
Living people
1962 births
Maxwell School of Citizenship and Public Affairs alumni